The AEG DJ.I was a highly streamlined biplane ground attack aircraft of late World War I that was undergoing evaluation at the time of the Armistice.

Design and development
The single seat attack biplane, which began evaluation in September 1918, carried a pair of 7.92 mm (.312 in) "Spandau"-type machine guns and a light bomb load. The design featured aluminium fuselage coverings, I-type interplane struts with no flying or landing wires, and protective armour.

Specifications (AEG DJ.I)

See also

References

Further reading

 Kroschel, Günter; Stützer, Helmut: Die deutschen Militärflugzeuge 1910–18, Wilhelmshaven 1977
 Munson, Kenneth: Bomber 1914–19, Zürich 1968, Nr. 20
 Nowarra, Heinz: Die Entwicklung der Flugzeuge 1914–18, München 1959
 Sharpe, Michael: Doppeldecker, Dreifachdecker & Wasserflugzeuge, Gondrom, Bindlach 2001, 

Single-engined tractor aircraft
Biplanes
DJ.I
1910s German attack aircraft
Aircraft first flown in 1918